Xymenopsis is a genus of sea snails, marine gastropod mollusks in the family Muricidae, the murex snails or rock snails.

Species
Species within the genus Xymenopsis include:
 Xymenopsis buccineus (Lamarck, 1816)
 Xymenopsis corrugata (Reeve, 1845)
 Xymenopsis flechensis Brunet 1997 
 Xymenopsis muriciformis (King & Broderip, 1833)
 Xymenopsis peninsularis Brunet 1997 
 Xymenopsis quenseli Brunet 1997 
 Xymenopsis subnodosus (Gray, 1839)
 Xymenopsis tcherniai (Gaillard, 1954)
Species brought into synonymy
 Xymenopsis albidus (Philippi, 1846): synonym of Xymenopsis buccineus (Lamarck, 1816)
 Xymenopsis corrugatus [sic]: synonym of Xymenopsis corrugata (Reeve, 1848)

References

External links
 Powell A. W. B. (1951). Antarctic and Subantarctic Mollusca: Pelecypoda and Gastropoda. Discovery Reports, 26: 47-196, pl. 5-10
 Barco, A.; Marshall, B.; Houart, R.; Oliverio, M. (2015). Molecular phylogenetics of Haustrinae and Pagodulinae (Neogastropoda: Muricidae) with a focus on New Zealand species. Journal of Molluscan Studies. 81(4): 476-488

 
Pagodulinae